{{Infobox person
| name = Kanhaiyalal
| image = Kanhaiyalal in the film Khilona.jpg
| caption = Kanhaiyalal in the film Khilona
| birth_name = Kanhaiya Lal Chaturvedi 
| birth_date = 
| birth_place = Benares (Varanasi), Uttar Pradesh, British India
| death_date = 
| death_place = 
| occupation = Actor, Production Manager
| website = 
| yearsactive= 1938–1982
| other names = 
| spouse =  
| children = 
| parents = Pandit Bhairodutt Choube (Father)
| relatives = 
| signature= 
|awards = 
|signature_alt=
}}

Kanhaiyalal (1910  14 August 1982) was an Indian actor who acted in 105 films in his career, primarily in Hindi films produced in Bollywood, the Mumbai-based film industry.

Early life

Kanhaiyalal was born in 1910 in Varanasi. His father Pandit Bhairodutt Choube, popularly known as Choubeji, was the proprietor of the Sanatan Dharm Natak Samaj in Varanasi. With his father not in agreement with him taking up any form of stage work, he eventually wore out his father's opposition and did odd jobs in the troupe. At 16, he started writing and then moved on to small roles. When his father died, the brothers tried for some time to run the drama company. Proving to be unsuccessful, they downed shutters and Kanhaiyalal decided to seek a film career in Bombay.
His elder brother Sankata Prasad Chaturvedi had already set a precedent and established himself as an actor in silent films, but Kanhaiyalal came to films without the intention of acting, wanting to write and direct instead. Eventually capitulating, he began by working as an extra in Sagar Movietone's Sagar Ka Sher. He would have remained a background extra but for a fated twist.

Career

He was fond of plays and came to Mumbai to find a space on stage. He staged his own written play Pandrah August in Mumbai, and later he tried his luck in films. He also had written many plays. In the 1939 film Ek Hi Raasta as Banke, he got a break in Hindi films and in 1940 he got the role of the moneylender (Sahukar) in Mehboob Khan's film Aurat as Sukkhi Lala. After that, he later acted in many films as a character artiste. When Mehboob Khan directed his film Mother India which was a remake of his earlier film 'Aurat', he again picked Kanhaiyalal to act as Sukkhi Lala, a character that came alive with his natural acting. Some of the performances of Kanhaiyalal which were appreciated by the audience for his versatility include his characters in the films  Bhookh (1947), Ganga Jamuna, Gopi, Upkar, Apna Desh, Janta Hawaldar,  Dushman, Bandhan, Bharosa, Dharti Kahe Pukar Ke, Hum Paanch, Upkar, Gaon Hamara Desh Tumhara, Dadi Maa, Gruhasti, Hatyara, Palkon Ki Chhaon Mein,  Heera, Teen Bahuraniyan, Dost etc.  His memorable roles include those as villainous scheming moneylenders in the films Mother India , Ganga Jamuna, Gopi and Upkaar.

As he recalled in an interview, "An actor playing Motilal's father had not reported on the sets, so there was an opportunity to step into the breach. The dialogue I had to speak ran to a full sheet of foolscap paper. Almost everyone on the sets was ready to laugh at me trying to be an actor, but God helped me and I did my job." The film was Jhul Badn, written by K. M. Munshi (the founder of Bharatiya Vidya Bhavan), directed by Sarvottam Badami and starring Motilal and Sabita Devi. To his delight, his talkie debut fetched him a ten rupee increment as his salary rose to Rs 45 a month. "Another promotion I earned was to play grandfather instead of father. This was in Sadhana (Old), also by Sagar Movietone. My grandson Prem Adib was the hero of the film. That was my first big role after which I became 'acceptable'. I was quite young but I thus started playing old roles. And, down the years, I got older and older but my roles didn't grow younger and younger!"

For Sadhana, he also wrote the dialogues and lyrics. In fact, it was while he was reading out the dialogues he had written that Chimanlal Desai, proprietor of Sagar, made him an offer to enact the role. "I must also put it on record that when the film was being made, quite a number of people thought I was bogus and withheld cooperation. However, the film was a big hit and achieved silver jubilee at Imperial Cinema."

Getting frustrated at not getting the chance to direct a film, however, after Sadhana, Kanhaiyalal went home to Varanasi. When he returned to Bombay, it was with the understanding that he would help Virendra Desai (son of Sagar Movietone boss, Chimanlal Desai). He rewrote the dialogue of Sanskar and also its lyrics, but it came to naught.

However, the rise of his career graph was launched by Mehboob Khan with writer Wajahat Mirza playing catalyst. At his instance Kanhaiyalal was selected for the role of Sukkhi Lala in Aurat (1940). He played the wicked moneylender who has evil designs on the young widow. As he reminisced in an interview, "On this production, too, I had the feeling that the ice had yet to be broken. There was no make-up man free or willing to attend to me. When I explained this difficulty to Faredoon Irani, the cinematographer, he calmly said, 'Don't worry. Just appear as you are and I will photograph you without makeup.' He did just that. My make-up consisted only of a moustache. There are not very many cinematographers who will stake their reputation by agreeing to photograph artistes without make-up. I admired Mr. Irani's courage and self-confidence. I regard my Aurat role as a really good one. I was helped tremendously by the lines Wajahat Mirza wrote for me. In fact, I firmly believe that what an actor needs most of all are good dialogue to enable him to do well."

During the shooting of the scene in which the house collapses on the salacious Sukhilala, Kanhaiyalal got hurt. In honour of the dictum, the show must go on, he right away told Mehboob Khan not to call a doctor immediately, but to finish the remaining shots. When he came out of the set eventually, the doctor was waiting for him. Aurat had a golden jubilee run with Sardar Akhtar (Mrs. Mehboob Khan) playing the lead. When Mehboob remade Aurat as Mother India (1957), only Kanhaiyalal reprised his role, a first in Hindi cinema with the same actor replaying the same character 17 years later.

Telescoped into the stereotype that bears his signature, early in his career he experimented much more than in his later years. "In Mehboob's film Bahen (1941), I had the role of a good-natured pickpocket. Here, four scenes originally conceived for me were spun out into about fourteen by Wajahat Mirza. In National Studios' Radhika (1941), directed by K. B. Lall, I played a temple priest and in Lal Haveli (1944, again by Lall), I played the comic role of a Pandit. Yakub starred in the film and his frequent punch line telling me Chacha, pasina aa raha hai became quite famous."

In Gunga Jumna (1961), he again excelled as a munim. He also shone in Mahesh Kaul's Sautela Bhai (1962), but the film tanked. Gemini's Grahasti (1962), in which he played a station master gave him immense satisfaction and he said: "In my opinion, it's the first picture from the South starring me to achieve that much versatility."

The trouble monger continued his winning streak with Upkar, Ram aur Shyam (both 1967), Teen Bahuraniyan, Dharti Kahe Pukare (1969), Gopi, Jeevan Mrityu (1970), Dushman (1972) Apna Desh (1972), Heera, Dost, Palkon Ki Chaon Mein, Karmayogi (1978), Janata Hawaldar (1979) and Hum Paanch (1980).

After completing a century of roles in Bollywood, Hathkadi (1982) became his swan song as his histrionics breathed their last on 14 Aug 1982 while he was 72.

Death

He died on 14 August 1982 at the age of 72.

Filmography

 Gramophone Singer ...1938
 Ek Hi Raasta as Banke ...1938
 Aurat as Sukhilala ...1939
 Radhika as Mohan ...1940
 Bahen as Moti ...1941
 Aasra ...1941
 Khilona as Kishore ...1942
 Dulhan ...1942
 Pagli Duniya ...1943
 Lal Haveli as Chacha ...1944
 Kiran ...1944
 Gaali ...1944
  Dost (1944 film) ...1944
 Shri Krishn Arjun Yuddha ...1944
 Ramayani ...1945
 Aarti ...1945
 Rasili ...1945
 Panihari ...1946
 Bhookh ...1946
 Toote Tare as Diwan Madanlal ...1946
 Jeet as Thakur Kalyan Singh ...1948
 Sipahiya ...1949
 Nishana ...1949
 Afsar as Village Tehsildar ...1950
 Malhar ...1950
 Hum Log as Lalaji / Haricharandas ...1951
 Buzdil ...1951
 Mr. Sampat as Seth Makhanlal Jhaverimull Gheewala ...1951
 Insaan ...1952
  Daag (1952 film) as Lala Jagat Narayan ...1952
 Annadata ...1952
 Naukari ...1952
 Bahut Din Huwe as Pujari ...1954
 Naata (1955) as Lakhibaba
 Devdas as Teacher ...1955
 Amaanat as Laxmidas ...1955
 Lalten ...1955
 Mother India as Sukhilala ...1957
 Do Roti as Lakshmidas ...1957
 Chhote Babu ...1957
 Bandi ...1957
 Sahara as Chaudhary Gaman Singh ...1957
 Panchayat as Charandas ...1958
 Swarg Se Sundar Desh Hamara ...1958
 C.I.D. ...1959
 Gharana as Advocate Shyam Lal Gupta ...1960
 Suhag Sindoor as Dayashankar ...1961
Gunga Jumna  as Kallu ...1961
 Son of India as Paro's dad ...1961
 Sautela Bhai as Gokul's father-in-law ...1962
 Meri Surat Teri Ankhen as Rahmat ...1962
 Grahasti  as Station Master Ram Swarup ...1963
 Bharosa as Raunak Lal ...1963
 Zindagi as Pandit ...1963
 Phoolon Ki Sej as Banwari ...1964
 Oonche Log as Gunichand ...1964
 Rishte Naahte as Roopa's Father ...1965
 Himalay Ki Godmein as Ghoghar Baba ...1965
 Saaz Aur Awaaz ...1965
 Gaban as Devideen Khati ...1966
 Daadi Maa as Totaram ...1966
 Biradari as Rammurthy 'Dudhwala' ...1966
 Diwana ...1966
 Upkar as Lala Dhaniram ...1967
 Ram Rajya ...1967
 Ram Aur Shyam as Munimji ...1967
 Dulhan Ek Raat Ki ...1967
  Aurat (1967 film), as Pandit  as (1967)
 Teen Bahuraniyan as Sita's and Mala's Father  as (1967)
 Rahgir as 1968
 Meri Bhabhi as 1969
 Doli as (1969)
 Dharti Kahe Pukarke...1969
 Chirag as Singh's employee as 1969
 Bandhan as Malikram ...1969
 Sharafat as Pratapchand as 1969
 Samaj Ko Badal Dalo as 1970
 Jeevan Mrityu as Jagat Narayan ...1970
 Holi Ayee Re ...1970
 Lakhon Me Ek as Manoharlal- Gauri's dad ...1970
 Dushman as Durga Prasad ...1971
 Banphool as Muninji ...1971 
 Tangewala as Munimji / Panditji ...1971
 Gaon Hamara Shaher Tumhara as Advocate Chandershekhar Pandey ...1972
 Apna Desh as Sevaram (1972)
 Annadata as Landlord (1972)
 Aan Baan as Dhaniram (1972)
 Anokhi Ada as Ram Prasad (1972)
   Heera as Lala Dhaniram (1973)
   Dost (1974 film) as Gadibabu (1974)
 Anokha as Lala Kanhaiyalal (1974)
 Mazaaq as Murali's Father (1975)
 Bhoola Bhatka as Ghanshamdas (1975)
 Raakhi Aur Rifle as (1976)
 Jadu Tona (1976)
 Hatyara as Pyarelal 'Pyare' (1977)
 Palkon Ki Chhaon Mein (1977)
 Dil Aur Patthar (1977)
 Satyam Shivam Sundaram as Pandit Shyam Sunder (1977)
 Rahu Ketu as Ramprasad (1978)
 Karmayogi as Landlord (1978)
 Janta Hawaldar (1978)
 Jaan-e-Bahaar (1979) 
 Sitara as Girdhari (1979)
 Hum Paanch as Lala Nainsukh Prasad Srivastav (1980) 
 Teen Ekkey  (1980)
 Kanhaiyaa as Makhanlal (1980)
 Haathkadi as Raghuvir (1981)

References

External links
 

Indian male film actors
Male actors in Hindi cinema
Date of birth missing
Male actors from Varanasi
20th-century Indian male actors
1910 births
1982 deaths